Johnny Edwards (27 March 1912 – 12 November 1973) was an  Australian rules footballer who played with North Melbourne in the Victorian Football League (VFL).

Notes

External links 

1912 births
1973 deaths
Australian rules footballers from Victoria (Australia)
North Melbourne Football Club players